The action of 8 May 1744 was a minor naval engagement of the War of the Austrian Succession in which two French ships of the line, the 60-gun Content, and the 64-gun Mars, captured the British 70-gun HMS Northumberland after a desperate action lasting four hours. Northumberlands captain, Thomas Watson, and her second lieutenant were among those killed.

Battle
On 8 May, Vice-Admiral Sir Charles Hardy's squadron cruising off Berlengas discovered a sail to the north, and the Northumberland was ordered to chase in that direction. The enemy sail was made out by the Northumberland to be a French ship of the line, and was found to be accompanied by two other ships; a 60-gun vessel and a frigate.

Instead of signalling the force of the ships in sight to the vice-admiral, Watson continued standing towards them under full sail, and was soon out of sight of his own fleet. The French ships were much separated; and at 5 pm Northumberland caught up with the stern most, which proved to be the Mars. Mars opened fire upon the Northumberland, which was immediately returned with vigour. But Captain Watson, whose bravery must ever be considered to have ranked higher than his discretion, instead of continuing to engage the Mars, pushed on and endeavoured to close the Content also; maintaining all the time, a running action with the Mars.

When the French ship Content approached, a most furious battle took place. After nine hours of fighting by the Northumberland was rendered wholly unmanageable, and having had her wheel knocked to pieces, the ship flew up into the wind. At the same time Captain Watson was mortally wounded; and the master of the ship, who was later court-martialled, struck the British colours.

Notes

References
 Maurice Dupont, Étienne Taillemite. Les guerres navales françaises: du Moyen Age à la guerre du Golfe.
 Léon Guérin. Histoire maritime de France:contenant l'histoire des provinces et villes maritimes, des combats de mer depuis la fondation de Marseille, 600 ans avant J.-C., de la flibuste, des navigations, voyages autour du monde, naufrages, célèbres, découvertes, colonisations, de la marine en général, avant, pendant et depuis le règne de Louis XIV jusqu'à l'année 1850, Vol. IV
 O. Troude. Batailles navales de la France, Vol. I
 Joseph Allen. (1872) Battles of the British Navy: from A.D. 1000 to 1840. Bell & Daldy Publishing. ASIN B00087UD9S

Conflicts in 1744
Naval battles of the War of the Austrian Succession
Naval battles involving Great Britain
Naval battles involving France